William Nightingale  was an English politician.

Nightingale was a Member of the Parliament of England for Bletchingley a rather small town borough in the occasional royal Parliaments of 1382, 1388 and 1390.

References

14th-century English people